The 2008 K League Championship was the twelfth competition of the K League Championship, and was held to decide the 26th champions of the K League. The top six clubs of the regular season qualified for the championship. The winners of the regular season directly qualified for the final, and second place team qualified for the semi-final. The other four clubs entered the first round, and the winners of the second round advanced to the semi-final. Each match was played as a single match, excluding the final which consisted of two matches. Suwon Samsung Bluewings became the champions by defeating FC Seoul 3–2 on aggregate in the final.

Qualified teams

Bracket

First round

Second round

Semi-final

Final

First leg

Second leg 

Suwon Samsung Bluewings won 3–2 on aggregate.

Final table

See also
2008 in South Korean football
2008 K League

References

External links
K League history 
Match report at K League 

K League Championship
K League
K League